The Bolivarian Military University of Venezuela (in Spanish Universidad Militar Bolivariana de Venezuela. The Military Bolivarian University of Venezuela (UMBV), is a National Experimental University of Venezuela, which operates under the military education of the nation, is under the Ministry of the People's Power for Defense. It was founded by Decree of the president Hugo Chávez. It is located in Caracas, Venezuela and it provides a four-year program of training for officer cadets.

Organization

Unlike other military academies, it is a system of Military academies, which offers studies in the different components that make up the armed forces of Venezuela. It is similar to several military academies in the world. It is a system of 5 military schools united in one single unit, also integrated by other schools and institutes recently opened.

The university system is composed of the following academies:

Military Academies
Military Academy of the Bolivarian Army, Caracas 
Military Academy of the Bolivarian Navy, Catia la Mar
Military Academy of the Bolivarian Aviation, Maracay
Military Academy of the Bolivarian National Guard, Caracas
Bolivarian Military Technical Academy, Maracay
National Armed Forces College of Military Communications, Electronics and Information Technology (Academia Tecnica Militar de Comunicaciones, Electrónica y Informatica)
Military Academy of Troop Officers Commander in Chief Hugo Rafael Chávez Frías, Santa Teresa del Tuy
Military Health Sciences Academy, Caracas

The following are also part of the academy system as affiliates:

Tactical, Technical and Logistical Studies
Army Infantry School General-in-Chief Rafael Urdaneta
Army Cavalry and Armor School Major General Juan Guillermo Iribarren
Army Artillery School Colonel Diego Jalón
Army Logistics School Brigadier General José Gabriel Pérez
Army Military Engineering School Brigadier General Francisco Jacot
Naval Tactical Studies School
Air Power College
Internal Security Studies School 
Armed Forces School of Intelligence Brigadier General Daniel Florence O'Leary
Languages College of the National Armed Forces Generalissimo Francisco de Miranda
 Army Languages School
 Navy Languages School
 Air Force Languages School
 National Guard School of Languages

Strategic Studies
 National Defense Advanced Studies Institute Grand Marshal of Ayacucho Anthonio Jose de Sucre (Instituto de Altos Estudios de la Defensa Nacional, IAEDEN)
 National Armed Forces War College Liberator Simón Bolívar

Personnel Training Institutions
The following institutions are also affiliated to the BMUV system:

 Army NCO School Major General Jose Feliz Ribas
 Navy Seamen's Training School
 Air Force NCO School
 National Guard Formation Schools
 National Militia NCO School

Research and Development
 National Center for Military Scientific Development
 Army Research and Development Center

See also
Military of Venezuela

External links 
 Minister of the People's Power for Defense
 Sitio oficial del Ejército Libertador
 Preguntas frecuentes para ingresar a la Academia Militar de Venezuela

References

 
Universities in Venezuela
Universities and colleges in Caracas
Educational institutions established in 2010
2010 establishments in Venezuela